The 3rd Greek Mountain Brigade (Triti Elliniki Οrini Τaxiarkhia, ΙΙΙ Ε.Ο.Τ.) was a unit of mountain infantry formed by the Greek government in exile in Egypt during World War II. It was formed from politically reliable right-wing and pro-royalist personnel following a pro-EAM mutiny among the Greek armed forces in Egypt in April 1944. Commanded by Colonel Thrasyvoulos Tsakalotos, it fought in the Battle of Rimini in Italy (under I Canadian Corps), where it earned the honorific title "Rimini Brigade" ( Τaxiarkhia Rimini) and against the EAM's Greek People's Liberation Army in the Dekemvriana events in Athens.

External links
 

Infantry brigades of Greece
Military units and formations of Greece in World War II
Military units and formations established in 1944
Infantry brigades in World War II
Military units and formations disestablished in 1945